In mathematical optimization, Zermelo's navigation problem, proposed in 1931 by Ernst Zermelo, is a classic optimal control problem that deals with a boat navigating on a body of water, originating from a point  to a destination point . The boat is capable of a certain maximum speed, and the goal is to derive the best possible control to reach  in the least possible time.

Without considering external forces such as current and wind, the optimal control is for the boat to always head towards . With consideration of current and wind, if the combined force applied to the boat is non-zero the control for no current and wind does not yield the optimal path.

History
In his 1931 article, Ernst Zermelo formulates the following problem:

This is an extension of the classical optimisation problem for geodesics –
minimising the length of a curve  
Although it is usually impossible to find an exact solution in most cases, the general case was solved by Zermelo himself in the form of a partial differential equation, known as Zermelo's equation, which can be numerically solved.

The problem of navigating an airship which is surrounded by air, was presented first in 1929 at a conference by Ernst Zermelo. Other mathematicians have answered the challenge over the following years. The dominant technique for solving the equations is the calculus of variations.

Constant-wind case

The case of constant wind is easy to solve exactly.
Let , and suppose that to minimise the travel time the ship 
travels at a constant maximum speed . Thus the position of the ship at 
Upon solving this, taking the positive square-root since  is positive, we obtain

 

Proof

By our assumption, clearly  with equality if and only if . Trivially if , we have . It remains to show  satisfies a triangle inequality 

Indeed, letting , we note that this is true if and only if

 

if and only if

 

which is true if and only if

 

Note: Since this is a strict inequality if  and 
 are not linearly dependent, it immediately follows that a straight 
We use a limiting argument to prove this is true for 
any curve.

General solution
Consider the general example of a ship moving against a variable wind . Then for a ship moving at maximum velocity  at variable heading , we have

 

The Hamiltonian of the system is thus

 

Using the Euler–Lagrange equation, we obtain

 

The last equation implies that . We note that the system is autonomous; the Hamiltonian does not depend on time , thus  = constant, but since we are minimising time, the constant is equal to 0.  Thus we can solve the simultaneous equations above to get

 

Substituting these values into our EL-equations results in the differential 
equation

 

This result is known as Zermelo's equation. Solving this with our system allows us to find the general optimum path.

Constant-wind revisited example
If we go back to the constant wind problem  for all time, we have

 

so our general solution implies  , thus  is constant,
i.e. the optimum path is a straight line, as we had obtained before with an 
algebraic argument.

References